Coleman Pond is a lake in the U.S. state of Georgia.

Coleman Pond was named after one Mr. Coleman, the original owner of the site.

References

Lakes of Georgia (U.S. state)
Bodies of water of Irwin County, Georgia